Margaux is a former commune in south-western France.

Margaux may also refer to:

 Margaux (name) 
 Château Margaux, a Bordeaux wine estate in Margaux, France
 Margaux AOC, a French wine growing region encompassing the villages of Margaux, Arsac, Labarde, Soussans and Cantenac

See also
 Margaux-Cantenac, a commune in Gironde, France